Todas as Mulheres do Mundo is a 1966 Brazilian comedy film directed by Domingos de Oliveira, based on the tales A Falseta and Memórias de Don Juan by Eduardo Prado.

Cast 
Leila Diniz .... Maria Alice
Paulo José .... Paulo
Flávio Migliaccio .... Edu
Joana Fomm ..... Barbara
Ivan de Albuquerque .... Leopoldo
Irma Álvarez .... Rita, garota argentina
Fauzi Arap .... Homem de São Paulo
Isabel Ribeiro .... Dunia
Anna Christina .... Ana Cristina
Ana Maria Magalhães .... Ana Maria
Frances Khan .... Frances
Tânia Scher...Tânia

Awards 
1966: Brasília Film Festival
Best Film (won)
Best Director (Domingos de Oliveira) (won)
Best Actor (Paulo José) (won)
Best Story and Dialogue (Domingos de Oliveira) (won)
Special Mention (Leila Diniz) (won)

References

External links 
 

1966 films
1960s Portuguese-language films
1966 romantic comedy films
Brazilian romantic comedy films